Imprisonment is the restraint of a person's liberty, for any cause whatsoever, whether by authority of the government, or by a person acting without such authority. In the latter case it is "false imprisonment". Imprisonment does not necessarily imply a place of confinement, with bolts and bars, but may be exercised by any use or display of force (such as placing one in handcuffs), lawfully or unlawfully, wherever displayed, even in the open street. People become prisoners, wherever they may be, by the mere word or touch of a duly authorized officer directed to that end. Usually, however, imprisonment is understood to imply an actual confinement in a jail or prison employed for the purpose according to the provisions of the law.

Sometimes gender imbalances occur in imprisonment rates, with incarceration of males proportionately more likely than incarceration of females.

History

Africa 
Before colonisation, imprisonment was used in sub-Saharan Africa for pre-trial detention, to secure compensation and as a last resort but not generally as punishment, except in the Songhai Empire (1464–1591) and in connection with the slave trade. In the colonial period, imprisonment provided a source of labor and a means of suppression. The use of imprisonment has continued to the present day.

Australia 
Incarceration in what became known as Australia was introduced through colonization. As noted by scholar Thalia Anthony, the Australian settler colonial state has engaged in carceral tactics of containment and segregation against Aboriginal Australians since colonizers first arrived, "whether that be for Christian, civilizing, protectionist, welfare, or penal purposes." When settlers arrived, they invented courts and passed laws without consent of Indigenous peoples that stated that they had jurisdiction over them and their lands. When Indigenous peoples challenged these laws, they were imprisoned.

England and Wales
In English law, imprisonment is the restraint of a person's liberty. The 17th century book Termes de la Ley contains the following definition:

Imprisonment without lawful cause is a tort called false imprisonment.
In England and Wales, a much larger proportion of the black population is imprisoned than of the white.

Release
Release from imprisonment may occur when a prison sentence has been served, conditionally such as on probation, or for humanitarian reasons. Prisoners of war may be released as a result of the end of hostilities or a prisoner exchange. Prisoners serving a full life or indefinite sentence may never be released.

Released prisoners maybe suffer from issues including psychiatric disorders, criminalized behaviours and access to basic needs. Post release resources may be provided by the authorities. Various factors have been investigated as to their influence on post-release recidivism, such as family and other relationships, employment, housing and ability to quit drug use.

See also

Criminal justice
Detention (imprisonment)
Imprisonment for public protection
Incarceration in Norway
Life imprisonment
Prison
Prisoner of war
Rehabilitation (penology)
Restorative justice

References

External links